Three Sisters is a 2012 Chinese documentary film directed by Wang Bing.

The film depicts three sisters (aged between four and ten years old) living in a small village near the Sino-Burmese border. They have been abandoned by their mother while their father seeks work in a nearby city.

The film received the Orizzonti Award at the 69th Venice International Film Festival, where it premiered.

An abridged version of the film was released under the title Alone in 2013.

External links

2012 documentary films
2012 films
Chinese documentary films
Films directed by Wang Bing
2010s Mandarin-language films
Films about sisters